The Ukraine national baseball team is the national baseball team of Ukraine and is controlled by Federation Baseball Softball Ukraine. The team represents the nation in international competition and competes in the bi-annual European Baseball Championship. The team has not yet placed in the championship.

Placings
European Baseball Championship

References

National baseball teams in Europe
Baseball
Baseball in Ukraine